Nakhon Sawan Sports School Stadium is a multi-purpose stadium in Nakhon Sawan, Thailand.  It is currently used mostly for football matches and is the home stadium of Paknampho NSRU F.C. The stadium holds 5,000 people.

Multi-purpose stadiums in Thailand
Buildings and structures in Nakhon Sawan province